Federal Highway 178 (Carretera Federal 178) is a Federal Highway of Mexico. The highway travels from Dzilam de Bravo, Yucatán in the east to Cansahcab, Yucatán in the west.

References

178